Emmanuelle 6 is a 1988 French softcore erotica movie directed by Bruno Zincone, and starred Austrian actress Natalie Uher. The screenplay was written by cult erotic horror specialist Jean Rollin, based on the novel Emmanuelle: The Joys of a Woman by Emmanuelle Arsan. The filming location was Venezuela. Although hardcore scenes were filmed to make this remake of the original 1974 version more edgy, they were not used in any known available cuts except for the French VHS version, which is 10 minutes longer.

Plot 
Emmanuelle (Natalie Uher) lives in Bangkok with her husband Jean, who is several years older. She likes him because he's taught her much sexually, and he likes her because she is very eager to learn. Although both have had extramarital affairs, they tolerate it as they are content with their arrangement.

A young woman named Marie-Ange comes to the house to visit with Emmanuelle, and she wants more than talk from her, but Emmanuelle herself is magnetically drawn to an older man named Bee, and one day he invites her to join him "in the jungle," to which she does.

Release 
It was released in July 1988 in France, but due to its dwindling popularity (despite the name) and the rise of more conventional hard-core pornography available for home viewing, the film made very little money and was never released worldwide except briefly in Spain and Germany.

Cast 
 Natalie Uher as Emmanuelle
 Jean-René Gossart as Professor Simon
 Thomas Obermuller as Benton
 Gustavo Rodriguez as Tony Harrison
 Haydée Balza as Rita
 Hassan Guerrar as Carlos
 Luis Carlos Mendes as Morales
 Tamira as Uma

References

External links 
 
 
 

1988 films
1980s erotic drama films
1980s pornographic films
Films shot in Venezuela
Films set in Venezuela
Emmanuelle
French erotic drama films
1988 drama films
1980s French films